Charles Monroe "Sparky" Schulz (November 26, 1922 – February 12, 2000) was an American cartoonist and the creator of the comic strip Peanuts, featuring what are probably his two best-known characters, Charlie Brown and Snoopy. He is widely regarded as one of the most influential cartoonists in history, and cited by many cartoonists as a major influence, including Jim Davis, Murray Ball, Bill Watterson, Matt Groening, and Dav Pilkey.

"Peanuts pretty much defines the modern comic strip", states Watterson, "so even now it's hard to see it with fresh eyes. The clean, minimalist drawings, the sarcastic humor, the unflinching emotional honesty, the inner thoughts of a household pet, the serious treatment of children, the wild fantasies, the merchandising on an enormous scalein countless ways, Schulz blazed the wide trail that most every cartoonist since has tried to follow."

Early life and education

Charles Monroe Schulz was born in Minneapolis, Minnesota, on November 26, 1922, and grew up in Saint Paul. He was the only child of Carl Schulz and Dena Halverson,  and was of German and Norwegian descent. His uncle called him "Sparky" after the horse Spark Plug in Billy DeBeck's comic strip Barney Google, which Schulz enjoyed reading.

Schulz loved drawing and sometimes drew his family dog, Spike, who ate unusual things, such as pins and tacks. In 1937, Schulz drew a picture of Spike and sent it to Ripley's Believe It or Not!; his drawing appeared in Robert Ripley's syndicated panel, captioned, "A hunting dog that eats pins, tacks, and razor blades is owned by C. F. Schulz, St. Paul, Minn." and "Drawn by 'Sparky'" (C.F. was his father, Carl Fred Schulz).

Schulz attended Richards Gordon Elementary School in Saint Paul, where he skipped two half-grades. He became a shy, timid teenager, perhaps as a result of being the youngest in his class at Central High School. One well-known episode in his high school life was the rejection of his drawings by his high school yearbook, which he referred to in Peanuts years later, when he had Lucy ask Charlie Brown to sign a picture he drew of a horse, only to then say it was a prank. A five-foot-tall statue of Snoopy was placed in the school's main office 60 years later.

Military service and post-war positions

In February 1943, Schulz's mother Dena died after a long illness. At the time of her death, he had only recently been made aware that she suffered from cancer. Schulz had by all accounts been very close to his mother and her death had a significant effect on him.

Around the same time, Schulz was drafted into the United States Army. He served as a staff sergeant with the 20th Armored Division in Europe during World War II, as a squad leader on a .50 caliber machine gun team. His unit saw combat only at the very end of the war. Schulz said he had only one opportunity to fire his machine gun but forgot to load it, and that the German soldier he could have fired at willingly surrendered. Years later, Schulz proudly spoke of his wartime service.  For being under fire he did receive the Combat Infantry Badge, of which he was very proud.

In late 1945, Schulz returned to Minnesota, where he did lettering for a Roman Catholic comic magazine, Timeless Topix.   Before he was drafted, Schulz had taken a correspondence course from the school Art Instruction, Inc., and in July 1946 took a job at the school, where he reviewed and graded students' work. He worked at the school for several years as he developed his career as a comic creator.

Career
Schulz's first group of regular cartoons, a weekly series of one-panel jokes called Li’l Folks, was published from June 1947 to January 1950 in the St. Paul Pioneer Press, with Schulz usually doing four one-panel drawings per issue. It was in Li'l Folks that Schulz first used the name Charlie Brown for a character, although he applied the name in four gags to three different boys as well as one buried in sand. The series also had a dog that looked much like Snoopy. In May 1948, Schulz sold his first one-panel drawing to The Saturday Evening Post; within the next two years, a total of 17 untitled drawings by Schulz were published in the Post, simultaneously with his work for the Pioneer Press. Around the same time, he tried to have Li'l Folks syndicated through the Newspaper Enterprise Association; Schulz would have been an independent contractor for the syndicate, unheard of in the 1940s, but the deal fell through. Li'l Folks was dropped from the Pioneer Press in January 1950.

Later that year, Schulz approached United Feature Syndicate with the one-panel series Li'l Folks, and the syndicate became interested. By that time Schulz had also developed a comic strip, usually using four panels rather than one, and to Schulz's delight, the syndicate preferred that version. But to his consternation, the syndicate had to change the title for Schulz's strip for legal reasons and selected a new name, Peanuts.

Peanuts made its first appearance on October 2, 1950, in seven newspapers. The weekly Sunday page debuted on January 6, 1952. After a slow start, Peanuts eventually became one of the most popular comic strips of all time, as well as one of the most influential. Schulz also had a short-lived sports-oriented comic strip, It's Only a Game (1957–59), but he abandoned it after the success of Peanuts. From 1956 to 1965 he contributed a gag cartoon, Young Pillars, featuring teenagers, to Youth, a publication associated with the Church of God.

In 1957 and 1961 he illustrated two volumes of Art Linkletter's Kids Say the Darndest Things, and in 1964 a collection of letters, Dear President Johnson, by Bill Adler.

Peanuts

At its height, Peanuts was published daily in 2,600 papers in 75 countries, in 21 languages. Over nearly 50 years, Schulz drew 17,897 published Peanuts strips. The strips, plus merchandise and product endorsements, produced revenues of more than $1 billion per year, with Schulz earning an estimated $30 million to $40 million annually. During the strip's run, Schulz took only one vacation, a five-week break in late 1997 to celebrate his 75th birthday; reruns of the strip ran during his vacation, the only time that occurred during Schulz's life.

The first collection of Peanuts strips was published in July 1952 by Rinehart & Company. Many more books followed, greatly contributing to the strip's increasing popularity. In 2004, Fantagraphics began their Complete Peanuts series. Peanuts also proved popular in other media; the first animated TV special, A Charlie Brown Christmas, aired in December 1965 and won an Emmy award. Numerous TV specials followed, the latest being Happiness is a Warm Blanket, Charlie Brown in 2011. Until his death, Schulz wrote or co-wrote the TV specials and carefully oversaw their production.

Charlie Brown, the principal character of Peanuts, was named after a co-worker at Art Instruction Inc. Schulz drew much from his own life, some examples being:
 Like Charlie Brown's parents, Schulz's father was a barber and his mother a housewife.
 Like Charlie Brown, Schulz had often felt shy and withdrawn. In an interview with Charlie Rose in May 1997, Schulz observed, "I suppose there's a melancholy feeling in a lot of cartoonists, because cartooning, like all other humor, comes from bad things happening."
 Schulz reportedly had an intelligent dog when he was a boy. Although this dog was a pointer, not a beagle like Snoopy, family photos confirm a certain physical resemblance.
 References to Snoopy's brother Spike living outside of Needles, California, were influenced by the few years (1928–30) the Schulz family lived there; they moved to Needles to join other family members who had relocated from Minnesota to tend to an ill cousin.
 Schulz's inspiration for Charlie Brown's unrequited love for the Little Red-Haired Girl was Donna Mae Johnson, an Art Instruction Inc. accountant with whom he fell in love. When Schulz finally proposed to her in June 1950, shortly after he had made his first contract with his syndicate, she turned him down and married another man.
 Linus and Shermy were named for his good friends Linus Maurer and Sherman Plepler, respectively.
 Peppermint Patty was inspired by Patricia Swanson, one of his cousins on his mother's side. Schulz devised the character's name when he saw peppermint candies in his house.

Influences
The Charles M. Schulz Museum counts Milton Caniff (Terry and the Pirates) and Bill Mauldin as key influences on Schulz's work. In his own strip, Schulz regularly described Snoopy's annual Veterans Day visits with Mauldin, including mention of Mauldin's World War II cartoons. Schulz also credited George Herriman (Krazy Kat), Roy Crane (Wash Tubbs), Elzie C. Segar (Thimble Theatre) and Percy Crosby (Skippy) as influences. In a 1994 address to fellow cartoonists, Schulz discussed several of them. But according to his biographer Rheta Grimsley Johnson:

According to the museum, Schulz watched the movie Citizen Kane 40 times. The character Lucy van Pelt also expresses a fondness for the film, and in one strip she cruelly spoils the ending for her younger brother.

Personal life
In April 1951, Schulz married Joyce Halverson (no relation to Schulz's mother Dena Halverson Schulz), and Schulz adopted Halverson's daughter, Meredith Hodges. Later the same year, they moved to Colorado Springs, Colorado. Their son, Monte, was born in February 1952, and three more children were born later, in Minnesota.

Schulz and his family returned to Minneapolis and stayed until 1958. They then moved to Sebastopol, California, where Schulz built his first studio. (Until then, he had worked at home or in a small rented office room.) It was there that Schulz was interviewed for the unaired television documentary A Boy Named Charlie Brown. Some of the footage was eventually used in a later documentary, Charlie Brown and Charles Schulz. Schulz's father died while visiting him in 1966, the same year Schulz's Sebastopol studio burned down. By 1969, Schulz had moved to Santa Rosa, California, where he lived and worked until his death. While briefly living in Colorado Springs, Schulz painted a mural on the bedroom wall of his daughter Meredith, featuring Patty with a balloon, Charlie Brown jumping over a candlestick, and Snoopy playing on all fours. The wall was removed in 2001, and donated and relocated to the Charles M. Schulz Museum in Santa Rosa.

By Thanksgiving of 1970, it was clear that Schulz's marriage was in trouble. He was having an affair with a 25-year-old woman named Tracey Claudius. The Schulzes divorced in 1972, and in September 1973, he married Jean Forsyth Clyde, whom he had first met when she brought her daughter to his hockey rink. They were married for 27 years, until Schulz's death in 2000.

Kidnapping attempt
On May 8, 1988, two gunmen in ski masks entered the Schulzes' home through an unlocked door, planning to kidnap Jean, but the attempt failed when Charles' daughter Jill drove up to the house, prompting the would-be kidnappers to flee. Jill called the police from a neighbor's house. Sonoma County Sheriff Dick Michaelsen said, "It was obviously an attempted kidnap-ransom. This was a targeted criminal act. They knew exactly who the victims were." Neither Schulz nor his wife was hurt during the incident.

Sports

Schulz had a long association with ice sports, and both figure skating and ice hockey featured prominently in his cartoons. In Santa Rosa, he owned the Redwood Empire Ice Arena, which opened in 1969 and featured a snack bar called "The Warm Puppy". Schulz's daughter Amy served as a model for the figure skating in the television special She's a Good Skate, Charlie Brown (1980). Schulz also was very active in senior ice-hockey tournaments; in 1975, he formed Snoopy's Senior World Hockey Tournament at his Redwood Empire Ice Arena, and in 1981, he was awarded the Lester Patrick Trophy for outstanding service to the sport of hockey in the United States. Schulz also enjoyed golf and was a member of the Santa Rosa Golf and Country Club from 1959 to 2000.

In 1998, Schulz hosted the first Over 75 Hockey Tournament. In 2000, the Ramsey County Board in St. Paul, Minnesota, voted to rename the Highland Park Ice Arena the Charles M. Schulz–Highland Arena in his honor.

Schulz also used his hockey rink for tennis exhibitions after meeting Billie Jean King. Many tennis pros played in the rink, including Roy Emerson.

Art
In addition to comics, Schulz was interested in art in general; his favorite artist in his later years was Andrew Wyeth. As a young adult, Schulz also developed a passion for classical music. Although the piano-playing character Schroeder in Peanuts adored Beethoven, Schulz's personal favorite composer was Brahms. He had a strong personal respect for Murray Ball, creator of Footrot Flats; the two men influenced each other throughout their careers.

Religion
According to a 2015 "spiritual biography", Schulz's faith was complex and personal. He often touched on religious themes in his work, including in the classic television cartoon A Charlie Brown Christmas (1965), which features Linus quoting  in the King James Version of the Bible to explain "what Christmas is all about." In interviews Schulz said that Linus represented his spiritual side, and the spiritual biography points out a much wider array of religious references.

Reared in a nominally Lutheran family, Schulz was active in the Church of God as a young adult and later taught Sunday school at a United Methodist Church. In the 1960s, Robert L. Short interpreted certain themes and conversations in Peanuts as consistent with parts of Christian theology, and used them as illustrations in his lectures on the Gospel, as explained in his book The Gospel According to Peanuts, the first of several he wrote on religion, Peanuts, and popular culture.

Schulz's daughter, Amy, was drawn to join the Church of Jesus Christ of Latter-day Saints by a Latter-day Saint boyfriend. According to Amy, Schulz told her that the "church is either true or it's a hoax. And I think it's a hoax." Although Schulz was disenchanted by Mormonism and his daughter's conversion, he continued to support her and, according to Amy, told her that he appreciated the bond between the two of them created by her belief "in Christ and the scriptures."

From the late 1980s, Schulz said in interviews that some people had described him as a "secular humanist" but that he did not know one way or the other:

In 2013, Schulz's widow said:

Failing health and retirement

In July 1981, Schulz underwent heart bypass surgery. During his hospital stay, President Ronald Reagan phoned to wish him a quick recovery.

In the 1980s, Schulz complained that "sometimes my hand shakes so much I have to hold my wrist to draw." This led to an erroneous impression that Schulz had Parkinson's disease. According to a letter from his physician, placed in the Archives of the Charles M. Schulz Museum by his widow, Schulz had essential tremor, a condition alleviated by beta blockers. Schulz still insisted on writing and drawing the strip by himself, resulting in noticeably shakier lines over time.

In November 1999, Schulz suffered several small strokes and a blocked aorta, and he was later found to have colon cancer that had metastasized. Because of the chemotherapy and because he could not see clearly, he announced his retirement on December 14, 1999. The decision was difficult for Schulz, who told Al Roker on The Today Show, "I never dreamed that this was what would happen to me. I always had the feeling that I would probably stay with the strip until I was in my early eighties. But all of a sudden it's gone. It's been taken away from me. I did not take this away from me."

Schulz was asked if, in his final Peanuts strip, Charlie Brown would finally get to kick the football after so many decades (one of the many recurring themes in Peanuts was Charlie Brown's attempts to kick a football while Lucy was holding it, only to have Lucy pull it back at the last moment, causing him to fall on his back). His response, "Oh, no. Definitely not. I couldn't have Charlie Brown kick that football; that would be a terrible disservice to him after nearly half a century." But in a December 1999 interview, holding back tears, Schulz recounted the moment when he signed his final strip, saying, "All of a sudden I thought, 'You know, that poor, poor kid, he never even got to kick the football. What a dirty trick—he never had a chance to kick the football.'"

Death
On February 12, 2000, Schulz died in his sleep of a heart attack at his home in Santa Rosa, California, at the age of 77. He was suffering from colorectal cancer. The last original Peanuts strip was published the following day. He had predicted that the strip would outlive him because the strips were usually drawn weeks before their publication. Schulz was buried at Pleasant Hills Cemetery in Sebastopol, California.

Schulz was honored on May 27, 2000, by cartoonists of more than 100 comic strips, who paid homage to him and Peanuts by incorporating his characters into their strips that day. 
While United Features retained ownership of the strip, Schulz requested that the syndicator allow no other artist to draw Peanuts. United Features honored his wishes, instead syndicating reruns. Because Schulz considered other media separate from the strip, new television specials and comic books with the Peanuts characters have been made since his death.

Awards

Schulz received the National Cartoonists Society's Humor Comic Strip Award in 1962 for Peanuts and the Society's Elzie Segar Award in 1980; he was the first two-time winner of their Reuben Award (for 1955 and 1964) and the winner of their Milton Caniff Lifetime Achievement Award in 1999. He was also an avid hockey fan; in 1981, Schulz was awarded the Lester Patrick Trophy for outstanding contributions to the sport of hockey in the United States, and he was inducted into the United States Hockey Hall of Fame in 1993. In 1988, Schulz received the Silver Buffalo Award, the highest adult award given by the Boy Scouts of America, for his service to American youth. On June 28, 1996, Schulz was honored with a star on the Hollywood Walk of Fame, adjacent to Walt Disney's. A replica of this star appears outside his former studio in Santa Rosa. On November 2, 2015, Snoopy was also honored with a star on the Hollywood Walk of Fame.

On January 1, 1974, Schulz served as the Grand Marshal of the Rose Parade in Pasadena, California. This led to the only Peanuts strip in which he made any reference to himself: Lucy was watching the parade, and told Linus that the Grand Marshall was somebody "you've never heard of". The same year, he received the Inkpot Award. In 1980, Schulz received the Golden Plate Award of the American Academy of Achievement, presented by Awards Council member Judge John Sirica.

Schulz was a keen bridge player, and Peanuts occasionally included bridge references. In 1997, the American Contract Bridge League (ACBL) awarded both Snoopy and Woodstock the honorary rank of Life Master, and Schulz was delighted.

On February 10, 2000, two days before Schulz's death, Congressman Mike Thompson introduced H.R. 3642, a bill to award Schulz the Congressional Gold Medal, the highest civilian honor the United States legislature can bestow. The bill passed the House (with only Ron Paul voting no and 24 not voting) on February 15, and the bill was sent to the Senate, where it passed unanimously on May 2. The Senate also considered a related bill, S.2060 (introduced by Dianne Feinstein). President Bill Clinton signed the bill into law on June 20, 2000. On June 7, 2001, Schulz's widow Jean accepted the award on behalf of her late husband in a public ceremony.

Schulz was inducted into the United States Figure Skating Hall of Fame in 2007.

Schulz was the inaugural recipient of The Harvey Kurtzman Hall of Fame Award, accepted by Karen Johnson, Director of the Charles M. Schulz Museum, at the 2014 Harvey Awards, held at the Baltimore Comic Convention in Baltimore, Maryland.

Military awards and decorations

Biographies
Multiple biographies have been written about Schulz, including Rheta Grimsley Johnson's Good Grief: The Story of Charles M. Schulz (1989), which Schulz authorized.

The lengthiest biography, Schulz and Peanuts: A Biography (2007) by David Michaelis, has been heavily criticized by the Schulz family; Schulz's son Monte stated it has "a number of factual errors throughout  ... [including] factual errors of interpretation", and he extensively documents these errors in a number of essays. However, Michaelis maintains that there is "no question" his work is accurate. Although cartoonist Bill Watterson (creator of Calvin and Hobbes) feels the biography does justice to Schulz's legacy, while giving insight into the emotional impetus of the creation of the strips, cartoonist and critic R.C. Harvey regards the book as falling short both in describing Schulz as a cartoonist and in fulfilling Michaelis' stated aim of "understanding how Charles Schulz knew the world". Harvey believes that Michaelis‘ biography inductively bends the facts to a thesis rather than logically deducing a thesis from the facts. Dan Shanahan's review, in the American Book Review (vol 29, no. 6), of Michaelis' biography faults the biography not for factual errors, but for "a predisposition" to finding problems in Schulz's life to explain his art, regardless of how little the material lends itself to Michaelis' interpretations. Shanahan cites, in particular, such things as Michaelis' crude characterizations of Schulz's mother's family, and "an almost voyeuristic quality" to the hundred pages devoted to the breakup of Schulz's first marriage.

In light of Michaelis' biography and the controversy surrounding his interpretation of Charles Schulz's personality, responses from Schulz's family reveal some intimate details about Schulz's persona beyond that of a mere artist.

Legacy
A proponent of crewed spaceflight, Schulz was honored with the naming of Apollo 10 command module Charlie Brown and lunar module Snoopy, which launched on May 18, 1969. The Silver Snoopy award is given to NASA employees and contractors for outstanding achievements related to human flight safety or mission success. The award certificate states that it is in appreciation for "professionalism, dedication and outstanding support that greatly enhanced space flight safety and mission success".

On July 1, 1983, Camp Snoopy opened at Knott's Berry Farm; it is a forested, mountain-themed area featuring the Peanuts characters. It has rides designed for younger children and is one of the most popular areas of the amusement park.

When the Mall of America in Bloomington, Minnesota, opened in 1992, its amusement park had a Peanuts theme, which stopped in 2006, when the mall lost the rights to use the characters.

The Jean and Charles Schulz Information Center at Sonoma State University opened in 2000 and now stands as one of the largest buildings in the California State University system, as well as in all of California, with a 400,000-volume general collection and a 750,000-volume automated retrieval system capacity. The $41.5 million building was named after Schulz, and his wife donated the $5 million needed to build and furnish the structure.

In 2000, the Sonoma County Board of Supervisors renamed the county airport the Charles M. Schulz–Sonoma County Airport. The airport's logo features Snoopy in goggles and scarf, taking to the skies on top of his red doghouse.

Peanuts on Parade has been St. Paul, Minnesota's tribute to its favorite native cartoonist. It began in 2000 with the placing of 101  statues of Snoopy throughout the city of St. Paul. Every summer for the following four years, statues of a different Peanuts character were placed on the sidewalks of St. Paul: Charlie Brown Around Town (2001), Looking for Lucy (2002), Linus Blankets St. Paul (2003) and Snoopy lying on his doghouse (2004). The statues were auctioned off at the end of each summer, so some remain around the city, but others have been relocated. The auction proceeds were used for artist's scholarships and for permanent bronze statues of the Peanuts characters, which are in Landmark Plaza and Rice Park in downtown St. Paul.

The Charles M. Schulz Museum and Research Center in Santa Rosa opened in August 2002, two blocks away from his former studio, celebrating his life's work and the art of cartooning. A bronze statue of Charlie Brown and Snoopy stands in Depot Park in downtown Santa Rosa.

Santa Rosa, California, celebrated the 55th anniversary of the strip in 2005 by continuing the Peanuts on Parade tradition, beginning with It's Your Town, Charlie Brown (2005), Summer of Woodstock (2006), Snoopy's Joe Cool Summer (2007), and Look Out For Lucy (2008).

In 2006, Forbes ranked Schulz as the third-highest-earning deceased celebrity, for he had earned $35 million in the previous year. In 2009, he was ranked sixth. According to Tod Benoit, Schulz's income during his lifetime totaled more than $1.1 billion.

Schulz's Santa Rosa home was destroyed during the October 2017 wildfires in California.

In 2019, Apple TV+ created a TV series titled For All Mankind, imagining what would have happened if the Russians had landed on the moon first. In later episodes an American base is established on the moon, and the latest astronaut to arrive at the station is given a badge featuring Linus with the camp blanket and is known as Linus until a new member arrives.

On November 26, 2022, over 75 syndicated cartoonists throughout the United States honored Schulz on what would have been his 100th birthday.

Footnotes

References
Primary sources
 
 
 
 
 
 

Secondary studies

External links

 Schulz's home page
 Charles Schulz Museum
 
 
 
 
 
 
 Lambiek Comiclopedia article.
 "Happiness is hearing an intellectual laugh!" Charles Schulz interviewed in his Marin County home study by Gail Rudwick and John Whiting, October 30, 1962

 
1922 births
2000 deaths
American comic strip cartoonists
American humanists
American satirists
American people of World War II
Artists from Minneapolis
Artists from Saint Paul, Minnesota
United States Army personnel of World War II
American people of German descent
American people of Norwegian descent
Burials in California
Congressional Gold Medal recipients
Deaths from cancer in California
Deaths from colorectal cancer
Former Lutherans
Former Methodists
Inkpot Award winners
Lester Patrick Trophy recipients
Members of the Church of God (Anderson, Indiana)
Military personnel from Minnesota
People from Needles, California
People from Santa Rosa, California
Reuben Award winners
People from Sebastopol, California
Primetime Emmy Award winners
United States Army non-commissioned officers
United States Hockey Hall of Fame inductees
Will Eisner Award Hall of Fame inductees
Christian comics creators
Academy of Magical Arts Special Fellowship winners